The Chungsong Bridge (충성의 다리, 忠誠) is a major road bridge across the Taedong River in Pyongyang opened in 1983. In the middle of the bridge it has off- and on-ramps westward to the smaller Ssuk Island (쑥섬) where the Pyongyang Sci-Tech Complex is located, and then on across a ditch to the larger and mainly agricultural Turu Island.

References

Bridges in North Korea